No. 27 Squadron of the Royal Air Force operates the Boeing Chinook from RAF Odiham.

History

First World War

Initially using aircraft borrowed from 24 Squadron, 27 Squadron moved to Swingate Down outside Dover in late November 1915, and in early February 1916, received its initial operating equipment, the Martinsyde Elephant fighter aircraft, hence the use of an elephant for the squadron badge. It transferred to France on 1 March 1916, serving as part of 9th Wing RFC. Initially the squadron was tasked with using its aircraft as escort fighters, but by the time the Battle of the Somme began, it was clear that the Elephant was unsuitable as a fighter. At the Somme, the squadron was initially tasked with mounting standing fighter patrols to protect British bombers and reconnaissance aircraft and with bomber-reconnaissance duties, taking advantage of the Martinsyde's good range and load carrying capacity, carrying out its first bombing mission on 1 July 1916. It was ordered to concentrate on bombing duties on 9 July.

The squadron continued to operate its Martinsydes into 1917, taking part in the Battle of Arras in April–May, the Battle of Messines in June, where the squadron attacked German airfields, and the Battle of Passchendaele (also known as the Third Battle of Ypres), where the squadron attacked railway targets and airfields, from July that year. It re-equipped with Airco DH.4s, which carried twice the bombload of the Martinsyde at greater speed and height, while carrying a gunner to defend against enemy fighters, from between September and December 1917, but was still equipped with a mixture of Martinsydes and DH.4s when it flew in support of the British offensive at Cambrai. 

In March 1918, the squadron moved to Villers-Bretonneux east of Amiens as part of a concentration of the RFCs resources against the likely route of a suspected German offensive. The morning of 21 March brought the start of Operation Michael, the opening part of the German spring offensive. At first the squadron was deployed against railway junctions, to slow the movement of German reinforcements. On 24 March, the squadron was forced to evacuate from Villers-Bretonneux, threatened by the German advance, to Beauvois-en-Cambrésis. On 25 March, as the Germans threatened to breakthrough near Bapaume, all available squadrons, including 27 Squadron, were ordered to carry out low level attacks against the German troops. The squadron continued to fly a mixture of low level attack against troop concentrations and high level attacks over the next few days, and on 29 March was forced to move airfields again, this time to Ruisseauville. On 1 April 1918, the RFC merged with the Royal Naval Air Service to form the Royal Air Force, but this had little effect on the squadrons at the front, with 27 Squadron continuing to operate against the German offensive. On 9 April, the Germans launched the second stage of its offensive, an attack near the River Lys at the junction between the British First and Second Armies. 27 Squadron was again deployed against the offensive attacking railway targets from 12 April. It started to receive DH.9 bombers in July 1918, but as these proved to be inferior to the DH.4, managed to keep some of its DH.4s until the end of the war. The squadron was disbanded on 22 January 1920.

Inter-war period
On 1 April 1920, No. 27 was reformed by re-numbering No. 99 Squadron RAF then in India, flying Airco DH.9A light bombers from Risalpur over the North-West Frontier. Operations included Pink's War, an aerial bombardment campaign against militant Mahsud tribesmen in South Waziristan in March and April 1925, the first colonial policing action carried out solely by the RAF, without the participation of the British Army. The squadron's DH.9As were eventually replaced by Westland Wapitis in 1928, when the squadron moved to Kohat. In December 1928, Flying Officer Tusk and Leading Aircraftman Donaldson (both of 27 Squadron), flew the first mission of the Kabul Airlift. Strictly a reconnaissance flight to ascertain the situation of the British Legation in Kabul during a civil war, they were shot at by local tribesmen and forced to land at a nearby airstrip. After this they managed to dash across no-man's land and arrived at the legation to set up communications with their home base of Risalpur.

War in the East
The outbreak of the Second World War in Europe in September 1939 saw part of the squadron deployed on coastal anti-submarine and anti-shipping patrols from Madras, before on 1 October 1939, the squadron became a flying training school training pilots for the Indian Air Force, operating de Havilland Tiger Moth and Hawker Hart biplanes as well as Wapitis, and based at Risalpur. Many of the squadron's former operational pilots were employed ferrying Bristol Blenheim bombers from Egypt to India and the Far East, and in January 1941, Blenheims started to be delivered to the squadron, allowing a Blenheim-equipped 27 Squadron to be split off from the training school in February and sent to Singapore. The squadron's Blenheims were Mk IF aircraft, fitted with an under-fuselage gun-pack for use as a long-range and night fighter, and were the only RAF night fighters in the Far East. The squadron moved to Butterworth in May 1941 and to Sungai Petani in August that year. Japan invaded Malaya on 8 December 1941, and 27 Squadron flew off eight Blenheims that morning to attack Japanese invasion shipping. Poor weather prevented them from locating any Japanese ships, however, and air attacks on Sungai Petani that day wrecked the airfield and left the squadron with only four airworthy aircraft. It was evacuated to Butterworth that evening. The remaining aircraft were pulled back to Singapore by 12 December, where they, together with a few Blenheim Is from other squadrons operated under the name of 27 Squadron. The remaining Blenheims based at Singapore, including those of 27 Squadron were evacuated to Sumatra from 23 January 1941, ending up operating from Palembang. On 14 February four of its Blenheims attacked Japanese ships invading Sumatra, with the loss of two Blenheims, with all airworthy aircraft evacuating to Java on 15 February. Here the squadron effectively ceased to exist.

A new No. 27 Squadron was formed at RAF Amarda Road India on 19 September 1942, although it initially had no aircraft, not receiving its first Bristol Beaufighter until 22 October and not having a full complement of Beaufighters until 21 December. It flew its first operation, an attack on Taungoo airfield in Burma, on 24 December 1942. The squadron moved to Kanchrapara in January 1943, and to Agartala in February, joining 169 Wing of 224 Group. The squadron used its Beaufighters for ground-attack missions over Burma and anti-shipping strikes. In April 1943, the squadron received a number of de Havilland Mosquitoes for evaluation, and a flight was re-equipped with Mosquitoes in December that year. The glue-and-plywood construction of the otherwise excellent Mosquito proved to be less than optimal for tropical Burma, and the operations were plagued by technical problems. They eventually relinquished the Mosquitoes to No. 680 Squadron RAF, retaining the Beaufighters and continuing the Squadron's diet of ground attack and anti-shipping strikes, switching to air-jungle rescue in April 1945.

Following the Japanese surrender, it was deployed to Batavia during the Indonesian War of Independence, being disbanded on 1 February 1946.

Post-war service
On 24 November 1947, the squadron reformed at RAF Oakington as a Transport unit equipped with Douglas Dakota transports.  It flew both routine scheduled transport routes and trained in glider towing, and took part in the Berlin Airlift in 1948–49.  It was disbanded on 10 November 1950. On 15 June 1953, No. 27 Squadron reformed at RAF Scampton as part of RAF Bomber Command, with Canberra bombers.  It took part in the Suez Crisis in 1956, and was disbanded at RAF Waddington on 31 December 1957.

In April 1961, the squadron reformed at RAF Scampton as the first squadron to be equipped with the Avro Vulcan B2 V bomber and formed part of the UK nuclear deterrent strike force. The squadron's Vulcans were equipped with the Blue Steel one megaton stand-off bomb until 1969 when their eight aircraft were each re-equipped with a WE.177B laydown bomb of 450 kt yield. The squadron's role assigned to SACEUR in a low-level penetration role was tactical support for ground forces resisting a Soviet land attack into Western Europe by striking targets assigned by SACEUR, beyond the forward edge of the battlefield, and deep into enemy-held areas. By the end of 1971 the squadron had relinquished its nuclear delivery role, and stood down until in December 1973 it was reformed at RAF Scampton with the Vulcan B2 to operate in the Maritime Radar Reconnaissance (MRR) role assigned to SACLANT.

From 1973 to 1982 the squadron performed the duties of 'Strategic Reconnaissance' with onboard equipment to monitor the fall-out from air and ground-based nuclear tests being performed by emerging nuclear powers in the Indian sub-continent and SE Asia.  The squadron's Vulcan B2s were modified (and re-designated as "Vulcan B.2 (MRR)") to carry underwing 'sniffer' and collection equipment to detect and collect samples of airborne contamination for later analysis at the Atomic Weapons Research Establishment (AWRE) at Aldermaston.  The samples were collected by flying through the high altitude dust cloud of a ground-based test or the downwind contamination of the upper atmosphere after an air burst. The squadron disbanded again at Scampton in 1982.

The squadron reformed again at RAF Marham in 1983 with twelve Tornado GR1 aircraft and eighteen WE.177 nuclear bombs, and once again assigned to SACEUR in 1984, the squadron's role was low-level penetration tactical support for ground forces resisting a Soviet land attack into Western Europe by striking targets beyond the forward edge of the battlefield. The squadron's allocation of eighteen WE.177 weapons was because of the greater carrying capacity of the Tornado, which could carry two weapons. The apparent mismatch between twelve Tornado aircraft and eighteen nuclear weapons was because RAF staff planners expected up to one third attrition of aircraft in the conventional phase, with sufficient aircraft held back in reserve to deliver the squadron's full stock of nuclear weapons if the conflict escalated to the use of tactical nuclear weapons. In September 1993, the squadron's Tornado aircraft and personnel moved to RAF Lossiemouth and took on the number plate of No. 12 Squadron which had recently disbanded at RAF Marham.

Helicopters

The No. 27 Squadron number plate was transferred to RAF Odiham and became No. 27 (Reserve) Squadron, the Chinook/Puma Operational Conversion Unit, formerly No. 240 Operational Conversion Unit RAF (OCU). It regained full squadron status in January 1998 equipped with Chinooks only. In 2002 the squadron's Chinooks saw service in Afghanistan as they transported Royal Marines from 3 Commando Brigade for Operation Jacana.

The squadron also served in a transport role during the 2003 invasion of Iraq and was stationed at Basra as part of No. 1310 Flight RAF, supporting Operation Telic. In July 2006, 3 Chinook helicopters of No. 27 Squadron deployed to RAF Akrotiri in Cyprus to evacuate British citizens from Lebanon. It deployed to Afghanistan for Operation Herrick in 2011.

In March 2020, the squadron was awarded the right to emblazon a battle honour on its squadron standard, recognising its role in the War in Afghanistan between 2001 and 2014.

Aircraft operated

Cultural references
In 2007, Olly Lambert made a documentary for the BBC about a two-month deployment of 27 Squadron in Helmand, Afghanistan. It documented the daily routines and work of the squadron personnel on duty during Operation Herrick. Named "Above Enemy Lines", it was first screened on BBC One on 9 October 2007, and was noted for its graphic portrayal of the evacuation and loss of Private Christopher Gray, fatally shot in an ambush in Now Zad on 13 April 2007.

See also
List of Royal Air Force aircraft squadrons

References

Bibliography

 
 Halley, James J. The Squadrons of the Royal Air Force & Commonwealth, 1918–1988. Tonbridge, Kent, UK: Air-Britain (Historians) Ltd., 1988. .
 Innes, David J. Beaufighters over Burma: 27 Squadron, Royal Air Force, 1942–45. Poole, Dorset, UK: Blandford Press, 1985. .
 Jefford, Wing Commander C.G. RAF Squadrons, a Comprehensive Record of the Movement and Equipment of all RAF Squadrons and their Antecedents since 1912. Shrewsbury: Airlife Publishing, 2001. .
 Jones, Barry. V-Bombers: Valiant, Victor and Vulcan. Ramsbury, UK: The Crowood Press, 2007. .
   
   
 
  
 
 
 Rawlings, John D.R. Coastal, Support and Special Squadrons of the RAF and their Aircraft. London: Jane's Publishing Company Ltd., 1982. .

External links

Squadron on RAF Website
RAF Odiham – 27 Sqn

Military units and formations established in 1915
027 squadron
027 Squadron
1915 establishments in the United Kingdom